Allandale is an unincorporated community in Volusia County, Florida, United States.

Allandale is surrounded on three sides by the city of Port Orange, with the remainder bordering the Halifax River.

History 
The community of Allandale was first advertised in the Daytona Daily News in December 1914, described as a "bungalow community", with advertisements emphasizing riverside lots facing the Halifax River. There was also a winter post office operating in Allandale from 1916 to 1941.

References 

Unincorporated communities in Volusia County, Florida
Unincorporated communities in Florida
Populated places on the Intracoastal Waterway in Florida